Per Magnus Erlingmark (born 8 July 1968) is a Swedish former footballer who played as a defender, midfielder, and forward. A versatile player, he is best remembered for his time with IFK Göteborg with which he won four Allsvenskan titles. A full international between 1990 and 1998, he made 37 appearances for the Sweden national team and appeared at UEFA Euro 1992 and at the 1994 FIFA World Cup where Sweden finished third.

Club career

Early career 
Erlingmark started off his career with BK Forward before signing with the Allsvenskan club Örebro SK in 1989. After having appeared in more than 100 Allsvenskan games for Örebro, he signed with IFK Göteborg ahead of the 1993 Allsvenskan season.

IFK Göteborg 
Erlingmark helped IFK Göteborg to four straight Allsvenskan titles between 1993 and 1996. His most memorable time with the club came during the 1994–95 UEFA Champions League season, where he helped Göteborg win their group ahead of FC Barcelona, Manchester United, and Galatasaray by scoring four goals. He played a total of 471 games for the club from 1993 until his retirement in 2004.

BK Häcken 
Erlingmark came out of his retirement ahead of the 2005 Allsvenskan and signed for BK Häcken as a back-up player, but never appeared in any competitive game during his lone season with the club.

International career

Youth 
Erlingmark represented the Sweden U21 team at the 1990 UEFA European Under-21 Championship where Sweden reached the semi-finals before being eliminated by the Soviet Union. He appeared a total of 10 times for the Swedish U21 team and scored one goal.

Senior 
Erlingmark made his senior debut for the Sweden national team in a friendly game against the United Arab Emirates which ended in a 1–2 loss for Sweden. On 17 April 1992, he scored his first international goal for Sweden in a friendly 2–2 draw with Greece.

He was a squad player for Sweden at UEFA Euro 1992 in which Sweden progressed to the semi-finals, and made his only appearance in the tournament as a substitute for Anders Limpar in a 1–0 group stage win against the eventual UEFA Euro 1992 champions Denmark. Two years later, Erlingmark represented Sweden at the 1994 FIFA World Cup in which Sweden finished third. He made his only appearance in the tournament coming in as a substitute for Joachim Björklund in a 3–1 group stage win against Russia.

Erlingmark played his last international game on 14 October 1998, coming on as a late substitute in a UEFA Euro 2000 qualifier against Bulgaria, which Sweden won 1–0. He won a total of 37 caps for Sweden between 1990 and 1998, scoring one goal.

Personal life 
He is the father of professional footballer August Erlingmark.

Career statistics

Club 

*Appearance(s) in the UEFA Champions League, the UEFA Cup, Allsvenskan qualifiers, and Svenska Mästerskapsserien.

International 

Scores and results list Sweden's goal tally first, score column indicates score after each Erlingmark goal.

Honours 
BK Forward
 Division 3 Västra Svealand: 1986

IFK Göteborg

 Allsvenskan: 1993, 1994, 1995, 1996
Sweden

 FIFA World Cup third place: 1994
Individual
 Stor Grabb: 1994
 Årets ärkeängel: 1997

References

External links

 

1968 births
Living people
Swedish footballers
Sweden international footballers
Sweden under-21 international footballers
Örebro SK players
BK Häcken players
IFK Göteborg players
Allsvenskan players
Ettan Fotboll players
UEFA Euro 1992 players
1994 FIFA World Cup players
BK Forward players
Sportspeople from Jönköping
Association football defenders